Wally K. Daly (13 November 1940 – 30 April 2020) was an English writer for television and radio and one-time chairman of the Writers' Guild of Great Britain. He was born in Grangetown, Middlesbrough.

Television
As well as some minor acting roles including Z-Cars, his writing credits include Juliet Bravo, Casualty and Byker Grove. He also wrote the 1984 radio series Anything Legal featuring Donald Hewlett  and Michael Knowles.

Daly also wrote a story for Doctor Who called The Ultimate Evil but due to its hiatus, the story was cancelled but was published in the popular range of Doctor Who books, then later adapted into a Big Finish audio story as a part of their Lost Stories audio range.

Theatre
In the early 1980s, three of his stage plays were performed at the Queen's Theatre, Hornchurch - The Miracle Shirker, Vaughan Street (both 1980) and a stage adaptation of his radio and television play Butterflies Don't Count (1982).

Radio plays

Whistling Wally (1974)
Everybody's Got A Quid (1975)
Priest (1975)
Confessor (1975)
Give Or Take The Odd Thousand (1977)
Before The Screaming Begins (BTSB Part I) (1978)
What's Stigmata? (1978)
The Silent Scream (BTSB Part II) (1979)
Burglar's Bargains (1979)
It's A Wise Child (1979)
Only the Lonely (1979)
Give or Take (1981)
A Right Royal Rip-Off (1982)
Time Slip (1983)
Anything Legal (1984)
With A Whimper To The Grave (BTSB Part III) (1984)
Welcome Sister Death (1984)
The Bigger They Are (1985)
A Plague of Goodness (1986)
Without Fire (1986)
Mary's (1987)
The Giftie (1988)
Cripplehead (1988)
Nightmare World (1989; R4 1990)
Focus (1990) Adapted from the Arthur Miller novel of the same name.
Orphans in Waiting (1990)
Fair Exchange (1992)
Butterflies Don't Count (1992)
The Broken Butterfly (1992)
2004 (1995)
Rasputin - Almost the Truth (1996)
Death of an Unimportant Pope (1997)
625Y (1999)
For I Have Sinned (2001)
The Adventures of Robin Hood (2001)|The Prioress's Story (2001)
Yesterday's Dreams (2002)
With This Ring (2003)
Suffer Little Children (2003)
The Children of Witchwood (2005)

Before the Screaming Begins (1978), the first part of a science fiction trilogy in three thirty-minute episodes for BBC Radio, featured James Laurenson, Donald Hewlett and Patrick Troughton. Part two was entitled The Silent Scream. It too featured James Laurenson and Donald Hewlett and also Hannah Gordon. Originally broadcast as a 90-minute play in 1979, it was re-broadcast in March and December 2008 as three thirty-minute episodes made from an off-air recording by Wally K. Daly as the original mastertape had been lost. The third part was entitled With a Whimper to the Grave. John Shrapnel replaced James Laurenson and Maureen O'Brien replaced Hannah Gordon. It also featured Donald Hewlett, Angela Thorne, Patrick Troughton and Timothy West. As with the first two parts it was re-broadcast on BBC Radio 7 in March and December 2008 in three thirty-minute episodes made from an off-air cassette recording by Wally K. Daly.

He was also a presenter for BBC Radio 2 on a brief early Saturday morning stint in the summer of 1994.

Bibliography
 Butterflies Don't Count (Play for Today), 1978, 
 The Ultimate Evil (Doctor Who), 1989 
 Love Without Hope (Byker Grove), 1991, 
 Fighting Back (Byker Grove), 1991, 
 Temptation (Byker Grove), 1992,

References

External links

Wally K Daly radio plays, Diversity entry

1940 births
2020 deaths
English radio writers
English television writers
British trade union leaders
BBC Radio 2 presenters